Frank Carbone may refer to:

 Frank Carbone (footballer) (born 1965), Australian rules footballer
 Frank Carbone (politician), mayor of the City of Fairfield
 Frankie Carbone, character in Goodfellas